Cisco Houston Sings Songs of the Open Road is a studio album by American folk singer Cisco Houston. It was released in 1960 by Folkways Records. In the liner notes, Cisco Houston writes that he's been from coast to coast at least thirty times and has traveled a "good part" of the world as well. This album presents thirteen songs about the tribulations and joys of life on the road. The album cover was designed by Ronald Clyne.

Track listing

References

1960 albums
Folkways Records albums